Pseudoschrankia leptoxantha is a moth of the family Noctuidae. It was first described by Edward Meyrick in 1904. It is endemic to the Hawaiian island of Molokai.

External links

Hypeninae
Endemic moths of Hawaii
Biota of Molokai
Moths described in 1904